Voragonema tatsunoko is a species of deep sea hydrozoan.

References

Animals described in 2010
Rhopalonematidae